David Campbell Kidd (29 September 1889 – 23 September 1954) was a New Zealand politician of the National Party.

Early life
Kidd was born in 1889 in Shag Point, Otago and received his education at Albany Street Public School in Dunedin. Together with his brother Peter, he worked on and later managed his father's farm, 'Moss Vale', Mt Nessing Road, Albury. He played rugby for the Albury club before the Great War. He went into World War I with the South Canterbury Mounted Rifles and was wounded in the Battle of Gaza in 1917. After the war, he took up a farm as a crown lease at 'Single Hill" Burkes Pass. In 1940 he purchased 'Manahune' in the Te Ngawai district of Albury.

Political career

Kidd became the first Dominion president of the Crown Tenants' Association, and was also represented on the Canterbury Land Board, and the Timaru Harbour Board.

He died on 23 September 1954 in Kimberley, South Africa, while returning from a Commonwealth Parliamentary Association conference in Nairobi, Kenya. 
He was succeeded by National's Alfred Davey.

Personal life
Kidd married Anne Elizabeth 'Nan' Stirling in 1919. Anne died in 1940 aged 43. They had two children together. He later married Bessie Loy, who outlived him.

Notes

References

|-

|-

1889 births
1954 deaths
People from Otago
New Zealand people of Scottish descent
New Zealand National Party MPs
New Zealand MPs for South Island electorates
Members of the New Zealand House of Representatives
New Zealand military personnel of World War I